The Special Operations Battalion, King's Guard, 3rd Special Forces Regiment, King's Guard  (พัน.ปพ.รอ.รพศ.3 รอ.) also known as Task Force 90 is the tier 1 special forces of the Royal Thai Army. It is currently part of the 3rd Special Forces Regiment, King's Guard Royal Thai Army Special Warfare Command.

History
The Task force 90 was founded by the 1st Division, King's Guard in 1981. The unit was promoted to King's Guard in 2019.

Mission
Task Force 90 is a well-known special mission unit tasked with black operation, counterterrorism, high-value target, hostage rescue and special operations missions, usually provided directly from the 3rd Special Forces Regiment, King's Guard and Counter Terrorist Operations Center, Royal Thai Armed Forces Headquarters (formerly from the Royal Thai Army HQ.)

See also
 Royal Thai Special Force
 Royal Thai Army Special Force
 Royal Thai Army Ranger
 Royal Thai Navy SEALs
 Thai Force Reconnaissance Marine
 Royal Thai Air Force Security Force Regiment
 Royal Thai Air Force Special Operations Regiment

References

Special forces of Thailand
King's Guard units of Thailand 
Hostage rescue units
Royal Thai Army 
Military units and formations established in 1981